Hancock County is a county located in the U.S. state of Georgia. As of the 2020 census, the population was 8,735. The county seat is Sparta. The county was created on December 17, 1793, and named for John Hancock, a Founding Father of the American Revolution.

Hancock County is included in the Milledgeville, Georgia Micropolitan Statistical Area.

History
Before the Civil War, Hancock County was developed for cotton plantations, as international demand was high for the commodity. The land was developed and the cotton cultivated and processed by thousands of enslaved African Americans. This area is classified as part of the Black Belt of the United States, primarily due to its fertile soil. It was later also associated with the slave society. Enslaved persons made up 61% of the total county population in the 1850 Census. Unusually for such a plantation-dominated society, the county's representatives at the Georgia Secession Convention, who were overwhelmingly white and Democratic, voted against secession in 1861.

But the secession conventions were dominated by men who voted for separation, and Georgia soon seceded and entered the war.

After the war, the freed black population predominated by number in the county for decades. After emancipation and granting of citizenship and the franchise, most freedmen joined the Republican Party, which they credited with gaining their freedom. Conservative white Democrats resisted political domination by blacks, although they were outnumbered. In the later years of Reconstruction, whites used violence, intimidation and fraud to suppress black voting. In 1908 the white-dominated legislature passed an amendment that effectively disenfranchised most black voters and many poor whites ones.

Contemporary voting issues
According to the 2010 census estimate, the racial makeup of the county seat of Sparta was 84% African American, 15% White, 0.50% from two or more races, 0.30% Asian, and 0.10% Native American. Hispanic or Latino of any race were 0.70% of the population. 

Since the late 20th century, most African Americans support the Democratic Party and conservative whites support the Republican Party.

In August 2015, the majority-white Hancock County Board of Elections initiated an effort to purge voters from the rolls. They directed deputy sheriffs to the homes of more than 180 black people residing in Sparta (these constituted some 20% of the city's total registered voters) to inform them they would lose their voting rights unless they appeared in court to prove their residency. A total of 53 voters were removed the voting rolls, but a federal judge overturned the Board's actions. It was asserted that these actions were racially based.

In 2021, the African-American elections superintendent for the City of Sparta was referred to the Georgia Secretary of State's Office for prosecution for allegedly imposing illegal requirements for candidates in the 2017 municipal election.

Geography

The western portion of Hancock County,  which is defined by a line running southeast from White Plains to the intersection of State Route 22 and Springfield Road, then running southwest along State Route 22, is located in the Upper Oconee River sub-basin of the Altamaha River basin.  The southern portion of the county, defined by a triangle made of State Route 22 and State Route 15, with Sparta at its apex, is located in the Lower Oconee River sub-basin of the same Altamaha River basin. The northeastern portion of Hancock County is located in the Upper Ogeechee River sub-basin of the Ogeechee River basin.

Major highways
No Interstate Highway
  State Route 248
  State Route 15
  State Route 16
  State Route 22
  State Route 77

Adjacent counties
 Taliaferro County - north
 Warren County - northeast
 Glascock County - east
 Washington County - southeast
 Baldwin County - southwest
 Putnam County - west
 Greene County - northwest

Demographics

2000 census
The county population is less than half its peak in 1910, a result of the migration of both blacks and whites from rural areas, especially during and after the Great Depression. Plantations and family farms have largely been replaced by industrial-scale farming, which required much less labor. Residents have struggled to make a living.

At the 2000 census there were 10,076 people, 3,237 households, and 2,311 families living in the county.  The population density was 21 people per square mile (8/km2).  There were 4,287 housing units at an average density of 9 per square mile (4/km2).  The racial makeup of the county was 77.76% Black or African American, 21.46% White, 0.16% Native American, 0.11% Asian, 0.14% from other races, and 0.38% from two or more races.  0.54%. were Hispanic or Latino of any race.

Of the 3,237 households 31.30% had children under the age of 18 living with them, 38.00% were married couples living together, 28.20% had a female householder with no husband present, and 28.60% were non-families. 26.10% of households were one person and 10.80% were one person aged 65 or older.  The average household size was 2.66 and the average family size was 3.22.

The age distribution was 24.10% under the age of 18, 9.90% from 18 to 24, 31.00% from 25 to 44, 23.00% from 45 to 64, and 12.00% 65 or older.  The median age was 36 years. For every 100 females, there were 114.60 males.  For every 100 females age 18 and over, there were 118.20 males.

The median household income was $22,003 and the median family income  was $27,232. Males had a median income of $26,062 versus $19,328 for females. The per capita income for the county was $10,916.  About 26.10% of families and 29.40% of the population were below the poverty line, including 45.40% of those under age 18 and 25.30% of those age 65 or over.

2010 census
As of the 2010 United States Census, there were 9,429 people, 3,341 households, and 2,183 families living in the county. The racial makeup of the county was 74.1% black or African American, 24.4% white, 0.5% Asian, 0.4% American Indian, 0.1% from other races, and 0.6% from two or more races. Those of Hispanic or Latino origin made up 1.5% of the population. In terms of ancestry, and 25.1% were American.

Of the 3,341 households, 28.1% had children under the age of 18 living with them, 36.8% were married couples living together, 23.7% had a female householder with no husband present, 34.7% were non-families, and 31.3% of households were made up of individuals. The average household size was 2.38 and the average family size was 2.98. The median age was 43.0 years.

The median income for a household in the county was $22,283 and the median family income  was $27,168. Males had a median income of $26,837 versus $21,223 for females. The per capita income for the county was $10,925. About 26.7% of families and 26.8% of the population were below the poverty line, including 37.3% of those under age 18 and 21.7% of those age 65 or over.

2020 census

As of the 2020 United States census, there were 8,735 people, 2,974 households, and 1,755 families residing in the county.

Communities
 Culverton
 Sparta (county seat)
 Mayfield

Politics
Hancock County has been one of the most consistently Democratic counties in the entire nation since the Civil War. But the composition of the party voters and policies they support have undergone major changes since the late twentieth century, switching from whites to African Americans. 

The majority of county voters have voted for the Democratic presidential nominee in every election since 1852 except that of 1972, when George McGovern lost every county in Georgia. McGovern did perform better here than elsewhere in the state, losing by only 93 votes. Apart from Richard Nixon in that election, Barry Goldwater in 1964 was the only Republican since at least 1912 to gain 30 percent of the county's vote. That year, most of the county's African-American majority was still largely disenfranchised and could not vote at all. The conservative white minority favored Goldwater because its traditional Democratic loyalties had frayed. 

In 1980 Hancock County gave its "favorite son" candidate Jimmy Carter his second best county in the nation. In 1984 it supported Walter Mondale, who won more than 76.6 percent of Hancock County ballots, making it his  fourth-best county outside the District of Columbia. He was otherwise within 3,819 votes of losing all fifty states.

Notable people
 James Abercrombie, (1795–1861), born in Hancock County, later member of the United States House of Representatives from Alabama.
 Amanda America Dickson, (November 20, 1849 – June 11, 1893), born in Hancock County. Daughter of Julia Frances Lewis Dickson, an enslaved person, and David Dickson, a white planter, she inherited her father's wealth and withstood court challenges to become the wealthiest African-American woman in the country.
 Charles Lincoln Harper, (1877-1855), born in Hancock County. First principal of Booker T. Washington High School in Atlanta Georgia, the first public high school for black students in the state of Georgia.
 William Henry Harrison, also known as Bill Thomas before emancipation, was a freedman and politician, a member of the Georgia House of Representatives elected during Reconstruction. 
 Camilla and Zack Hubert, two formerly enslaved persons, established a homestead in the county. The Huberts were among the first African-American landowners in central Georgia and played influential roles in the area. The couple raised twelve children, who all attended historically black colleges and universities (HBCUs). All seven of the Huberts' sons graduated from Morehouse College in Atlanta. The four oldest daughters graduated from Spelman College, also in Atlanta. The youngest Hubert daughter Mabel graduated from Jackson State College in Jackson, Mississippi. Her older brother Zachary Taylor Hubert (1878-1958) had been installed as president in 1915.
 Horace Grant, twin brother of Harvey Grant and a former NBA basketball player, won four championships with the Chicago Bulls and Los Angeles Lakers.  Grant graduated from Hancock Central High School.
 Harvey Grant, twin brother of Horace Grant and a former NBA basketball player with the Washington Bullets, Portland Trail Blazers, and Philadelphia 76ers. Grant graduated  from Hancock Central High School.
 Thomas Jackson, Thomas "Tommy" Jackson, often known as "Hurricane" Jackson, was an American professional boxer who competed from 1951 to 1961. In July 1957, he defeated Floyd Patterson for the heavyweight championship.
 Biddy Mason (August 15, 1818 – January 16, 1891), an enslaved African-American woman, sued in  a freedom suit in California, a free state. She gained freedom and became a landowner, humanitarian and philanthropist. She was a founding member of the First African Methodist Episcopal Church (1872), in Los Angeles, California.
 Hiram George Runnels, (December 15, 1796 – December 17, 1857) born in Hancock County, Ga., became a politician and served as Governor of Mississippi.
 William Terrell, (1778 – July 4, 1855), politician and member of Georgia House of Representatives. His house still stands in Sparta today.

See also

 Central Savannah River Area
 National Register of Historic Places listings in Hancock County, Georgia
 Glen Mary Plantation
List of counties in Georgia

References

External links

 New Georgia Encyclopedia. Hancock County
 Hancock County historical marker
 Powelton Baptist Church historical marker

 
Georgia (U.S. state) counties
1793 establishments in Georgia (U.S. state)
Milledgeville micropolitan area, Georgia
Black Belt (U.S. region)
Populated places established in 1793
Majority-minority counties in Georgia